Sigapatella tenuis is a species of sea snail, a marine gastropod mollusc in the family Calyptraeidae, the slipper snails, Chinese hat snails and cup-and-saucer snails. It is found in New Zealand.

References 

 Powell, A. W. B., New Zealand Mollusca, William Collins Publishers Ltd, Auckland, New Zealand 1979 
 Marshall B.A. 2003. A review of the Recent and Late Cenozoic Calyptraeidae of New Zealand (Mollusca: Gastropoda). The Veliger 46(2): 117-144

External links
 

Calyptraeidae
Gastropods of New Zealand
Gastropods described in 1868
Taxa named by John Edward Gray